Svatharanesvarar Temple, Pudukkudi  is a Siva temple in Perambur  in Tiruvarur district in Tamil Nadu (India).

Vaippu Sthalam
It is one of the shrines of the Vaippu Sthalams sung by Tamil Saivite Nayanar Appar. This place is now known as Pathinettu Pirambil.

Presiding deity
The presiding deity is Svatharanesvarar. The Goddess is known as Anandavalli.

Location
This temple is located in Kumbakonam-Eravanjeri road, just before Eravancheri

References

Shiva temples in Tiruvarur district